A Mãe-de-santo (or ialorixá, is a priestess of Umbanda, Candomblé and Quimbanda, the Afro-Brazilian religions.  In Portuguese those words translate as "mother of [the] saint[s]", which is an adaption of the Yoruba language word iyalorishá, a title given to priest women in African religions. Iyá means mother, and the contraction l'Orishá means "of Orishá". As a product of the syncretism, the word Orishá (elevated or ancestral spirit) was adapted into Portuguese as saint. 

The priestesses mães-de-santo are more venerated in African-Brazilian religions than the male priests, the pais-de-santo.

In the Afro-Brazilian religions the priests are the owners of the tradition, knowledge and culture and the ones responsible to pass it on to the new generations because there are no sacred written books.

See also
 Pai-de-santo

Religious syncretism in Brazil
Brazilian mythology
Afro-American religion
Candomblé
Umbanda